Gigadema is a genus of beetles in the family Carabidae, containing the following species:

 Gigadema biordinatum Sloane, 1914
 Gigadema bostocki Castelnau, 1867
 Gigadema dux Blackburn, 1901
 Gigadema froggatti Macleay, 1888
 Gigadema grande (Macleay, 1864)
 Gigadema gulare Sloane, 1914
 Gigadema longipenne (Germar, 1848)
 Gigadema mandibulare Blackburn, 1892
 Gigadema maxillare Sloane, 1914
 Gigadema noctis (Newman, 1842)
 Gigadema obscurum Sloane, 1914
 Gigadema rugaticolle Blackburn, 1901
 Gigadema sulcatum (Macleay, 1864)

References

Anthiinae (beetle)